Opelousas Catholic School is a private, Catholic school in Opelousas, Louisiana. Located in the Roman Catholic Diocese of Lafayette, the school offers education from pre-kindergarten 3/4 through 12th grade.

Athletics
Opelousas Catholic athletics competes in the LHSAA.

Championships
Football Championships
(1) State Championship: 1974

References

External links
  School Website

Catholic secondary schools in Louisiana
Schools in St. Landry Parish, Louisiana
Private middle schools in Louisiana
Private elementary schools in Louisiana
Opelousas, Louisiana